You Know Who You Are is the eighth studio album by alternative rock band Nada Surf. It was released on the Barsuk record label on March 4, 2016.

Two songs were co-written with Dan Wilson of the band Semisonic.

Accolades

Track listing
 "Cold to See Clear" - 4:04
 "Believe You're Mine" - 4:35
 "Friend Hospital" - 4:57
 "New Bird" - 3:02
 "Out of the Dark" - 3:44
 "Rushing" - 4:05
 "Animal" - 5:14
 "You Know Who You Are" - 2:22
 "Gold Sounds" - 4:56
 "Victory's Yours" - 3:46

mixed by:
Chris Shaw at Double Dog studios on 1.
John Agnello assisted by Gabriel Bento at Water Music on 2, 3, 6, 7 & 9.
John Goodmanson at Studio Bogroll on 4, 5, 8 & 10.

mastered by Chris Athens in Austin, TX.

Personnel:
Matthew Caws - vocals, guitar
Daniel Lorca - bass guitar
Ira Elliot - drums & percussion
Doug Gillard - guitar
additionel:
Joe McGinty - keyboards
Ken Stringfellow - background vocals 
Martin Wenk - trumpet
Dan Wilson - background vocals

Charts

References

External links
 Barsuk Records - album page

2016 albums
Nada Surf albums